André Maurício Conceição de Souza  Aracaju Sergipe,  Is a Brazilian experimental and theoretical physicist with interests in particle physics and general relativity, and a Professor of physics at the Federal University of Sergipe.

Biography
Professor André Maurício Conceição de Souza's degree in Bachelor and Bachelor of Physics from the  Federal University of Sergipe;Masters and Ph.D. e by the Brazilian Center for Physics Research in Rio de Janeiro; Postdoctoral Fellow at the University of Stuttgart in Germany. Fellow researcher Productivity 1D of CNPq; Associated former researcher at the International Theoretical Physics Institute based in Italy and member of the National Institute of Complex Systems. He was Director of CCET, Research Coordinator and Information Technology of the UFS, as well as Coordinator of Physical Courses. Former member of the Scientific Committee FAPESE and FAPITEC. Advisor Scientific Initiation, Monograph, Master, Doctoral and Postdoctoral Fellow in physics. It has two book chapters in international scientific publishers, 56 articles published in international journal, 1 textbook and dozens of articles published in scientific congresses.

References
Biography of the rector of the UFS
André Maurício toma posse hoje como vice-reitor
UFS empossa professor André Maurício como vice-reitor
Vice-reitor recebe título de cidadão Sergipano
Corte de energia no Campus da UFS gera transtornos e ação judicial contra Energisa Jornal do Dia
Vigilantes da UFS encerram paralisação G1 - Globo.com
Andre Mauricio Conceicao de Souza cienciabrasil.org.br
Membros eleitos:Conselho | Associação Sergipana de Ciência
Novos reitor e vice da UFS obtêm quase cinco mil votos infonet.com.br

Academic staff of the Federal University of Sergipe
Federal University of Sergipe alumni
Brazilian physicists
1976 births
Living people